Lindsley Farrar Armstrong Smith (born September 8, 1963) is an American educator and former state legislator who recorded interviews with some her her female colleagues in the legislature. She served in the Arkansas House of Representatives from 2005 to 2010.

She was born in Birmingham, Alabama. She received an associate degree from Jefferson State Community College her BA and MA from University of West Florida. She taught. She married communications professor Stephen Smith in 1994. She earned a J.D. from the University of Arkansas. She served in the Arkansas House from 2005 to 2010. She represented District 92 and Fayetteville.

References

Living people
Members of the Arkansas House of Representatives
University of West Florida alumni
University of Arkansas School of Law alumni
Women state legislators in Arkansas
Politicians from Fayetteville, Arkansas
Politicians from Birmingham, Alabama
21st-century American women politicians
21st-century American politicians
1963 births